X-Fi may refer to:
 X-Fi (audio chip), an audio processor by Creative Labs
 Sound Blaster X-Fi a line of PC sound cards by Creative Labs utilizing the audio chip of the same name